Jason Kim (born Kim Ju-hwan on 1981) is a South Korean film director and screenwriter.

Career 
Kim, born in 1981, majored in international politics from Georgetown University in the United States. He served for three years as an interpreter in the Republic of Korea Air Force before joining Showbox's promotion department and later the film investment department. He dreams of making his own films and has made in his spare time youth drama films Goodbye My Smile (2010) and Koala (2013). He later quit his job to pursue his career in filmmaking. He spent three years working on the script of his first mainstream film Midnight Runners (2017) which became a hit in South Korea and was also screened overseas.

Filmography 
Goodbye My Smile (2010) - director
Koala (2013) - director, screenwriter
Retriever (short film, 2016) - director
Midnight Runners (2017) - director, screenwriter
The Divine Fury (2019) - director, screenwriter
 My Heart Puppy (2023) director, screenwriter

References

External links 
 
 

1981 births
Living people
South Korean film directors
South Korean screenwriters
Georgetown University alumni